This is a list of Eastern Michigan Eagles in the NFL draft.

Key

Selections

References

Eastern Michigan

Eastern Michigan Eagles NFL draft